is Japanese rock band Bump of Chicken's third and major debut studio album, released on February 20, 2002. It peaked at #1 on the Oricon Weekly Charts. Jupiter was #45 on the 2002 Oricon Top 100 Albums.

Track listing

References

External links
Jupiter - Bump of Chicken official website

2002 albums
Bump of Chicken albums
Japanese-language albums